Si Prefecture or Sizhou may refer to:

 Si Prefecture (Jiangsu) (泗州), a former prefecture of imperial China in present-day Jiangsu and Anhui
 Si Prefecture (Shanxi) (肆州), a former prefecture of imperial China in present-day Shanxi
 Si Prefecture (Guangxi), a former prefecture of imperial China in present-day Guangxi

See also
 Sizhou, Jiangsu (泗州鎮), a town in Jiangsu